Burchell's sandgrouse (Pterocles burchelli) is a species of bird in the family Pteroclidae. It is found in arid and semi-arid regions of southern Africa. The name of this bird commemorates the English naturalist William John Burchell.

Description
Burchell's sandgrouse is a plump bird about the size of a pigeon with a small head and short legs. The body is light brown, mottled with darker shades and white speckles. In males, the eye is surrounded by bare yellow skin and the cheeks and throat are pale grey.

Distribution and habitat
Burchell's sandgrouse is found in Angola, Namibia, Botswana, Zambia, Zimbabwe and South Africa. It is normally resident but moves about to a limited extent depending on the availability of water and the seeds it mainly eats. It is widespread and common in much of its range. It frequents areas of rough grass and scrub, especially on red Kalahari sand and has been able to extend its range because of the greater availability of water after the sinking of boreholes by farmers.

Breeding
Burchell's sandgrouse is monogamous and breeds during the dry season between April and October. The nest is formed in a shallow depression in the ground often concealed among grass tussocks or under a bush. It is lined with a few fragments of dry vegetation and two or usually three eggs are laid. Both parents incubate the eggs and the chicks are precocial when they hatch, covered in down and soon able to run after the adult birds. Both parents care for the young and, as in other sandgrouse species, water is brought to them absorbed in the specially adapted feathers that line the parents' breasts.

References

External links

 Burchell's sandgrouse - Species text in The Atlas of Southern African Birds.

Pterocles
Birds of Southern Africa
Birds described in 1922
Taxa named by William Lutley Sclater
Taxonomy articles created by Polbot